István Kovács (2 October 1920 – 12 May 1995) was a Romanian-Hungarian football player and coach. By winning 15 major titles he is one of the most successful association football coaches in the history of the game. In 2019, France Football ranked him at No. 43 on their list of the Top 50 football managers of all time.

Career
Born into an ethnic Hungarian family in Timișoara, Romania, Kovács was an average midfielder, although having both individual technique and tactical intuition. He was never selected to play for Romania unlike his older brother Nicolae Kovács, who was one of the five players who participated at all three World Cups before the Second World War.

Kovács had his first major coaching successes at the helm of Steaua București, where he won between 1967 and 1971 once the championship and three times the cup of Romania.

After this he succeeded Rinus Michels as the head of Ajax in 1971, continuing and expanding on his "total football" philosophy. With Ajax he achieved in 1972 and 1973, two consecutive European Champions Cups. In 1972, he even won the Intercontinental Cup and also the first edition of European Supercup (1973). Further to that he led Ajax to the double of cup and championship in 1972 and another national championship in 1973.

After he left Ajax in 1973, he was called up by the French football federation to take the reins of the national side. In this position he raised the young generations of French talents. Journalists of France Football asked him when he arrived how long it would take to make the France team a great team, he replied visionary with structures in eight years, ten years, we can make a good national team. Michel Hidalgo, his deputy and successor, took advantage of this work and continued to lead the team of France to its victory at Euro 84.

After this episode, he returned to Romania becoming its national team coach. Later he had further successes with Panathinaikos and Monaco.

He died on 12 May 1995, twelve days before Ajax won their fourth European Cup.

Managerial honours

Club
Universitatea Cluj 
Divizia B: 1957–58
Steaua București
Divizia A: 1967–68
Romanian Cup: 1968–69, 1969–70
Ajax
Eredivisie: 1971–72, 1972–73
KNVB Cup: 1971–72
European Cup: 1971–72, 1972–73
European Super Cup: 1972
Intercontinental Cup: 1972
Panathinaikos
Greek Cup: 1981–82

Individual
World Soccer 36th Greatest Manager of All Time: 2013
France Football 43rd Greatest Manager of All Time: 2019

Bibliography

Notes

References

External links
French Football Federation Profile 
Stefan Kovacs at WeAreFootball 
Stefan Kovacs at Labtof 

1920 births
1995 deaths
Romanian sportspeople of Hungarian descent
Sportspeople from Timișoara
Romanian footballers
Association football midfielders
CA Timișoara players
CA Oradea players
R. Olympic Charleroi Châtelet Farciennes players
FC Ripensia Timișoara players
CFR Cluj players
FC Universitatea Cluj players
Liga I players
Liga II players
Liga III players
Belgian Pro League players
Romanian expatriate footballers
Romanian expatriate sportspeople in Belgium
Expatriate footballers in Belgium
Romanian football managers
FC Universitatea Cluj managers
CFR Cluj managers
FC Steaua București managers
AFC Ajax managers
France national football team managers
Romania national football team managers
Panathinaikos F.C. managers
AS Monaco FC managers
Eredivisie managers
Super League Greece managers
Ligue 1 managers
UEFA Champions League winning managers
Romanian expatriate football managers
Romanian expatriate sportspeople in the Netherlands
Romanian expatriate sportspeople in France
Romanian expatriate sportspeople in Monaco
Romanian expatriate sportspeople in Greece
Expatriate football managers in the Netherlands
Expatriate football managers in France
Expatriate football managers in Monaco
Expatriate football managers in Greece